Gordon Wright (1866-1950) was an architect in New York State.  He designed several buildings which are listed on the National Register of Historic Places for their architecture.

He was born in Massena, New York in 1866.  He graduated from Syracuse University with degrees in civil engineering and architecture.

He opened an architectural office in Syracuse in 1892.

He partnered with Charles R. Ellis from 1931 to 1938.  His daughter Marjorie Wright, who also studied architecture at Syracuse University, was associated with the firm from 1919 until her death in 1949.

Works include the following, but this article has been significantly altered losing a significant piece of his body of work:
Alexander Brown House, 726 W. Onondaga St., Syracuse, NY, NRHP-listed
O.M. Edwards Building, 501 Plum St., Syracuse, NY, NRHP-listed
Smyrna Elementary School (1941), School St., SE of NY 80, Smyrna, NY, NRHP-listed

Notes

References

Architects from Syracuse, New York
19th-century American architects
20th-century American architects
People from Massena, New York
Syracuse University alumni
1866 births
1950 deaths